Dr. Dooom 2 is the ninth solo studio album by American rapper Kool Keith, and his second release under the Dr. Dooom moniker following First Come, First Served. It was released on September 23, 2008 via Threshold Recordings. The album was produced entirely by KutMasta Kurt, except for one song "God of Rap" produced by TomC3, and featured guest appearances from Motion Man, FatHed and Denis Deft.

Lyrical themes
"Simon" refers to American Idol host Simon Cowell. According to Thornton, "I think for one guy to sit up and judge people and for him to be British at that—who the fuck is he to judge people? [...] What is Simon's qualifications?" "R.I.P. Dr. Octagon" was written in response to The Return of Dr. Octagon. According to KutMasta Kurt, "Without that album, we wouldn't have made this album. There would have been no need for Dr. Dooom to come back." "Step-N-Fetchers" focuses on African American entertainers who encourage and promote negative stereotypes. "Always Talkin' Out Your Ass" focuses on the music industry. Thornton states that "That song is about a lot of things: how people tend to do things expensive and then they do things cheap at the same time, so they have a contradicted lifestyle".

Track listing

Personnel
 Denis Martinez - guest vocals (track 8)
 Keith Matthew Thornton - main artist
 Kurt Matlin - mixing, arranger, songwriter, producer (tracks 1-8, 10-15) for Funky RedNeck Productions
 Mike Gilbert - artwork cover and layout design
 Paul Laster - guest vocals (track 15)
 R. Tiano - guest vocals (track 4)
 Thomas Cleary III - producer (track 9) for Lone Wolf Productions
 Volunteer Media - graphics

References

External links 

2008 albums
Kool Keith albums